Justin Thompson may refer to:

 Justin Thompson (baseball) (born 1973), Major League Baseball pitcher
 Justin Thompson (darts player) (born 1969), Australian darts player
 Justin Thompson (soccer) (born 1981), Canadian soccer defender